Daniel Victor "Boone" Kirkman (born February 6, 1945) is a former amateur and professional heavyweight boxer. He compiled a 36-6 career record, with 26 knockouts, having limited success against the top fighters of the era he met in the ring - beating only an over-the-hill former ununified heavyweight champion Jimmy Ellis while losing to top contenders Kenny Norton and Ron Lyle, and a still green future heavyweight champion George Foreman.  He also beat contender Eddie Machen, and went 1-1 against Doug Jones.

Kirkman spent his entire career based in Seattle, Washington.

Early life
Kirkman was born in Vallejo, California in 1945 to Oehm and Margarite Kirkman. His father, a naval officer, was stationed there at the time. When his father was discharged from the Navy, the family moved back to Renton, Washington, where Kirkman's grandfather initially settled.

From a young age, Kirkman's favorite activities were hunting, fishing, and hiking throughout the state of Washington with his father. He frequently stopped to view plant and animal life, earning him his lifelong nickname of "Boone". Growing up in Renton, a working-class community, Kirkman joined a group of 20 teenagers called the "Buds" that regularly drank alcohol and smoked. Considering the rampant street crime in the area, this was only of moderate concern to Kirkman's father. During this time, Kirkman became interested in boxing during regular sparring sessions with his older brother Steve.

Noting Kirkman's lack of interest in reading, a school friend recommended Rocky Graziano's autobiography Somebody Up There Likes Me, which was adapted into a film starring Paul Newman a year later. Kirkman's fondness of both the book and the film catalyzed him to pursue boxing at a serious level.

Kirkman's first training sessions at age 14 involved traveling to a south Seattle gymnasium to work out from his school in Renton. The venue was suggested to him by former professional Joey Velez. Kirkman took a year-long hiatus from boxing due to injury, but returned to the gym and won several local Golden Gloves events afterward, slowly building a reputation.

His popularity exploded in March 1965 when he won the AAU Heavyweight Boxing national title in Toledo, Ohio. Following the event, he was signed by Seattle-area fight manager Jack Hurley. Kirkman assumed co-ownership of his family's pub; The Melrose Tavern, shortly after his signing. Between bar tending shifts, Kirkman incorporated training, and spent most nights punching a speed bag, entertaining spectators.

Professional career
Boone Kirkman's professional career lasted from 1966 to 1978. He finished with a record of 36—6, with a 60 knockout percentage and a peak ranking of seventh.

His first match, held in Boise, ended in a knockout over Lou Phillips. Kirkman managed to go undefeated in his first eleven matches, including a win over the dangerous but erratic Eddie Machen, until being stopped by the skilled Doug Jones in a featured fight held in Seattle. Jones opened a cut over Kirkman's left eye in the first round, but Kirkman managed to keep the veteran at bay until worsening damage to the wound caused the ring physician to stop the fight.

Six weeks later Kirkman avenged the defeat and began a 10-bout winning streak.  Feeling confident, Hurley scheduled a match between Kirkman and recent Olympic heavyweight champion and two-year professional George Foreman at the Madison Square Garden.

Kirkman-Foreman (1970)
The Foreman fight was scheduled for November 18, 1970. Foreman was the most heavily favored opponent Kirkman would ever face.

From the start, Kirkman was overmatched by Foreman's superior quickness and power. Foreman pummeled Kirkman with a combination of powerful punches, knocking him to the canvas three times in the first two rounds. The bout ended in a technical knockout after just three minutes and forty seconds, when Kirkman failed to answer the bell.

Following the fight, Kirkman elected to opt-out of his contract with Hurley.

Post-Foreman (1970-1973)
Following the fight with Foreman, Kirkman won yet another 10 consecutive bouts, half by knockout. One of his more notable victories during this stretch came against Jack O'Halloran via points. He also encountered his second opponent ranked (at one time in their career) in the Ring Magazine Top 10 in by then over-the-hill ex-ununified heavyweight champion Jimmy Ellis, whom he defeated by split decision.

Later struggles (1974)
On April 9, 1974, Kirkman fought Memphis "Al" Jones in what Kirkman considered a "tune-up fight". The fight was stopped abruptly when Kirkman, having knocked Jones down four times in the first two rounds, was knocked unconscious by a right hook from Jones. This was Kirkman's first loss in over three and a half years.

Following the loss, Kirkman immediately scheduled several ranked opponents in an attempt to recover his sinking ranking. As a result, Kirkman experienced consecutive losses for the first time in his career after losing to Ken Norton, on his return to Seattle in June 1974. Norton was known as "the guy that broke Ali's jaw", doing it the previous year as a 7-1 underdog. The Kirkman-Norton fight was stopped by the referee when Kirkman failed to answer the bell for the eighth round.

In September, Kirkman fought Ron Lyle (who suffered a narrow defeat to Ali the following year for the WBA and WBC titles), but lost again when the referee stopped the fight due to a cut on Kirkman's cheek.

Relationship with Jack Hurley
Kirkman and Jack Hurley were often at odds during Hurley's tenure. In interviews, Kirkman has expressed several criticisms of his former manager, including uncooperative behavior, leaving his boxers unprepared for fights, and a failure to secure a fight with Muhammad Ali during his prime (when Kirkman was the seventh-ranked boxer in the world). Additionally, Hurley was not heavily involved during the training process, which contributed to poor scheduling.

Two other former boxers who were signed to Hurley, Harry Matthews and Pete Radarmacher, experienced similar frustrations, often finding themselves overmatched when up against highly-ranked opponents.

Professional boxing record

Exhibition boxing record

Personal life
After retiring from boxing at age 33, Kirkman became a Boeing delivery truck driver. He retired from Boeing in 2010.

Kirkman lives near Renton with his wife Teese, a retired nurse. The two have been married since 1988. He has two children from a previous marriage, Erik and Nina. He also has two grandchildren.

In his spare time, Kirkman enjoys hiking and mountaineering. He has scaled four of the five highest peaks in Washington:  Mount Rainier, Mount St. Helens, Mount Adams, and Mount Baker.

Notes

External links

Boxers from California
Boxers from Washington (state)
Sportspeople from Renton, Washington
Sportspeople from Vallejo, California
1945 births
Living people
American male boxers
Heavyweight boxers